Argos High School is a public high school in Argos, Indiana, United States, educating grades 9 through 12.

See also
 List of high schools in Indiana

References

External links
 Argos High School

Public high schools in Indiana
Schools in Marshall County, Indiana
1957 establishments in Indiana